The Damakawa are an ethnic group of about 500-1000 people in northwest Nigeria. They live in three villages near Maganda in Sakaba Local Government Area, Kebbi State. They used to speak the Damakawa language, but have now shifted to C'Lela.

External links
A brief account of the Damakawa language 

Ethnic groups in Nigeria
Kebbi State